Jumellea is an orchid genus with 55 species native to Madagascar, the Comoros, the Mascarenes, and eastern Africa. In horticulture, it is often abbreviated Jum.

Etymology
It is named after Henri Lucien Jumelle, a French botanist.

Ecology

Pollination
Jumellea exhibits the typical adaptions to pollination by hawk moths. However, also auto-pollination is known to occur in Jumellea stenophylla.

Phylogeny
Jumellea is proven to be monophyletic.

Jumellea is the sister group to Aeranthes. Both genera together are the sister group to Angraecum:

Angraecum evolved into a separate lineage about 9.12 million years ago, and the genera Jumellea and Aeranthes separated about 9.55 million years ago. This means these genera date back to the Miocene.

Taxonomy

Species

 Jumellea alionae P.J.Cribb, 2009
 Jumellea ambrensis H.Perrier, 1938
 Jumellea amplifolia Schltr., 1925
 Jumellea angustifolia H.Perrier, 1938
 Jumellea anjouanensis (Finet) H.Perrier, 1941
 Jumellea arachnantha (Rchb.f.) Schltr., 1915
 Jumellea arborescens H.Perrier, 1938
 Jumellea bathiei Schltr., 1925
 Jumellea bernetiana J.-B.Castillon, 2011
 Jumellea bosseri Pailler, 2009
 Jumellea brachycentra Schltr., 1925
 Jumellea brevifolia H.Perrier, 1939
 Jumellea comorensis (Rchb.f.) Schltr., 1915
 Jumellea confusa (Schltr.) Schltr., 1915
 Jumellea cowanii (Ridl.) Garay, 1972
 Jumellea cyrtoceras Schltr., 1918
 Jumellea dendrobioides Schltr., 1925
 Jumellea densifoliata Senghas, 1964
 Jumellea divaricata (Frapp. ex Cordem.) Schltr., 1915
 Jumellea exilis (Cordem.) Schltr., 1915
 Jumellea fragrans (Thouars) Schltr., 1914
 Jumellea francoisii Schltr., 1925
 Jumellea gladiator (Rchb.f.) Schltr., 1915
 Jumellea gregariiflora H.Perrier, 1939
 Jumellea hyalina H.Perrier, 1938
 Jumellea ibityana Schltr., 1925
 Jumellea intricata H.Perrier, 1938
 Jumellea jumelleana (Schltr.) Summerh., 1951 (publ. 1952)
 Jumellea lignosa (Schltr.) Schltr., 1915
 Jumellea linearipetala H.Perrier, 1938
 Jumellea longivaginans H.Perrier, 1938
 Jumellea majalis (Schltr.) Schltr., 1915
 Jumellea major Schltr., 1925
 Jumellea marojejiensis H.Perrier, 1951
 Jumellea maxillarioides (Ridl.) Schltr., 1925
 Jumellea nutans (Frapp. ex Cordem.) Schltr., 1915
 Jumellea ophioplectron (Rchb.f.) Schltr., 1915
 Jumellea pachyceras Schltr., 1925
 Jumellea pachyra (Kraenzl.) H.Perrier, 1941
 Jumellea pailleri F.Rakotoar., 2011
 Jumellea papangensis H.Perrier, 1938
 Jumellea peyrotii Bosser, 1970
 Jumellea phalaenophora (Rchb.f.) Schltr., 1915
 Jumellea porrigens Schltr., 1925
 Jumellea punctata H.Perrier, 1938
 Jumellea recta (Thouars) Schltr., 1915
 Jumellea recurva (Thouars) Schltr., 1915
 Jumellea rigida Schltr., 1925
 Jumellea rossii Senghas, 1967
 Jumellea similis Schltr., 1925
 Jumellea spathulata (Ridl.) Schltr., 1925
 Jumellea stenoglossa H.Perrier, 1951
 Jumellea stenophylla (Frapp. ex Cordem.) Schltr., 1915
 Jumellea stipitata (Frapp. ex Cordem.) Schltr., 1915
 Jumellea tenuibracteata (H.Perrier) F.P.Rakotoar. & Pailler, 2012
 Jumellea teretifolia Schltr., 1925
 Jumellea triquetra (Thouars) Schltr., 1915
 Jumellea usambarensis J.J.Wood, 1982
 Jumellea walleri (Rolfe) la Croix, 2000
 Jumellea zaratananae Schltr., 1925

References

External links 
 
 

 
Vandeae genera
Flora of Madagascar
Flora of Africa